Sir Percy Edward Kent  (18 March 1913 – 9 July 1986) was a British geologist who won the Royal Medal in 1971. Awarded the Bigsby Medal in 1955 and the Murchison Medal in 1969, he was made a Knight Bachelor in the 1973 Birthday Honours.

Early life
He attended West Bridgford Grammar School. From the University of Nottingham he gained a BSc in 1934, and a PhD in 1941.

Career
P.E. Kent joined Louis Leakey and Mary Leakey in their 1935 investigation of Olduvai Gorge. He was Chief Geologist from 1966-71 of BP. In 1969-1970 he served as the President of the Lincolnshire Naturalists' Union, where he already served as the sectional officer for geology. From 1974-6 he was President of the Geological Society of London.

Personal life
He married Margaret (Betty) Hood in 1940, and they had two daughters, one of whom is Helen Cooper. His first wife died in 1974. In 1976 he married Lorna Scott. He lived in West Bridgford.

References

1913 births
1986 deaths
Royal Medal winners
20th-century British geologists
BP people
Fellows of the Royal Society
Fellows of the Geological Society of London
Knights Bachelor
People from West Bridgford
People educated at West Bridgford School
Alumni of the University of Nottingham
Members of the Lincolnshire Naturalists' Union